The Department of Rapid Transit Systems (DORTS) is a Taipei City Government branch established in 1987 which oversees the construction and regulation of the Taipei Metro system along with DRTS (New Taipei), while the Taipei Rapid Transit Corporation handles the running and maintenance of the system.

References

External links

Official website

Public transportation in Taiwan
1987 establishments in Taiwan
Government of Taipei